Ossahatchie is an unincorporated community in Harris County, Georgia, United States.

Geography

The community is located approximately halfway between Ellerslie and Waverly Hall along U.S. Route 27 Alternate and Georgia State Route 85 at its junction with Ossahatchie Creek Rd.

References

Unincorporated communities in Harris County, Georgia